"Lullaby" is a song by English DJ and record producer Sigala and English singer-songwriter Paloma Faith. It was written by Sigala, Faith, Jess Glynne, Jin Jin, Josh Record, Andrew Bullimore and Joakim Jarl with the song's production handled by Sigala, Joe Ashworth and Jarly. It was released to digital retailers on 23 February 2018, through Ministry of Sound Recordings and B1 Recordings. "Lullaby" is included in the Zeitgeist Edition of Faith's fourth studio album, The Architect. On the 12 January 2019, “Lullaby” was nominated for “Best British Single” at the Brits.

Background
"Lullaby" was first announced by Sigala on 22 February 2018, it is Faith's second dance collaboration after "Changing" with Sigma in 2014. Talking about the song, Sigala said: "Lullaby is about always going back to that person who has stuck with you through all the highs and the lows. Ultimately it is a song about love, but I have managed to keep that word out of the title this time! I love finding unique voices, and Paloma's is perfect for this track. I can't wait for you all to hear it!"

Track listing

Credits and personnel
Credits adapted from Tidal.

Sigala – composition, production
Paloma Faith – composition, vocals
Andrew Bullimore – composition, background vocals
Josh Record – composition, background vocals
Jess Glynne – composition
Jin Jin – composition
Joe Ashworth – production
Joakim Jarl – composition, production
Kevin Grainger – mix engineering, master engineering
Lauren Flynn – background vocals
Kirsten Joy – background vocals
Janelle Martin-Cousins – background vocals
Nym – background vocals
Dipesh Parmar – editing, programming
Mark Ralph – vocal production

Charts

Weekly charts

Year-end charts

Certifications

References

2018 singles
2018 songs
Songs written by Jess Glynne
Songs written by Sigala
Songs written by Paloma Faith
Paloma Faith songs
Sigala songs
Tropical house songs
Electropop songs
Songs written by Jin Jin (musician)
Songs written by Josh Record
Song recordings produced by Mark Ralph (record producer)
Songs written by Andrew Bullimore